Patalet Geon is a former Minister of Tourism Development, Culture, and the Arts in the Republic of Chad. Serving from June 2020 to April 20, 2021, he assumed the position following the departure of Madeleine Alingue.

References

Living people 
Year of birth missing (living people)
Place of birth missing (living people)
Tourism ministers of Chad
Culture ministers of Chad